The 2018 Phillips 66 Big 12 men's basketball tournament was a postseason men's basketball tournament for the Big 12 Conference. It was played from March 7 to 10, in Kansas City, Missouri at the Sprint Center. Kansas defeated West Virginia in the championship game to win the tournament and receive the conference's automatic bid to the NCAA tournament.

Seeding
The Tournament consisted of a 10 team single-elimination tournament with the top 6 seeds receiving a bye. Teams were seeded by record within the conference, with a tiebreaker system to seed teams with identical conference records. These are the tiebreakers (5–8 involve both ties with two teams and ties with multiple teams):
 If two teams have an identical conference record, then the team with the better head-to-head record gets the higher seed
 If a tie can't be broken by the tiebreaker above, then the team with the better record against the 1 seed gets the higher seed
 If those records are the same, then the team with the better road record against the top seed gets the higher seed
 If multiple teams are tied, and you can't use the 1st tiebreaker, then the team with the better head-to-head record against the other tied teams gets the higher seed.
 If tiebreaker number 4 can't break the tie between multiple teams, then the team with the better record against the 1 seed gets the higher seed
 If those records are the same, the team with the better road record gets the higher seed
 If those records are the same, the team with the better road record against the top seed gets the higher seed
 If those records are the same, a public draw will be held to determine the top seed

Schedule

Bracket

* Indicates overtime game

All-Tournament Team
Most Outstanding Player – Malik Newman, Kansas

See also
2018 Big 12 Conference women's basketball tournament
2018 NCAA Division I men's basketball tournament
2017–18 NCAA Division I men's basketball rankings

References

External links
Official 2018 Big 12 Men's Basketball Tournament Bracket

Tournament
Big 12 men's basketball tournament
Big 12 men's basketball tournament
Big 12 men's basketball tournament
College sports tournaments in Missouri